A Labrador Low is a type of extratropical cyclone that forms off the coast of Labrador in eastern Canada. These lows typically move into the Labrador Sea and eventually into the North Atlantic Ocean off the coast of Iceland.

See also
 Colorado low 
 Gulf low
 Panhandle hook
 Aleutian Low

References

External links

Extratropical cyclones